Cobra Strike may refer to:

G.I. Joe: Cobra Strike, a video game for the Atari 2600
Cobra Strike, a side project of musician Buckethead
Cobra Strike, a science fiction novel by Timothy Zahn